Mbala District is a district of Zambia, located in Northern Province. The capital lies at Mbala. As of the 2000 Zambian Census, the district had a population of 149,634 people.

References

Districts of Northern Province, Zambia